José Rivera (born 29 December 1962) is a Spanish ski jumper. He competed in the normal hill and large hill events at the 1984 Winter Olympics.

References

1962 births
Living people
Spanish male ski jumpers
Olympic ski jumpers of Spain
Ski jumpers at the 1984 Winter Olympics
Sportspeople from Barcelona